is a 3D augmented reality video game developed and published by Genius Sonority for the Nintendo 3DS's eShop.  It was released in Japan on February 8, 2012, in North America on September 27, 2012, and in Europe and Australia on December 6, 2012.  A sequel named The Denpa Men 2: Beyond the Waves was released in Japan and in the West. The title features improved gameplay, more dungeons, and other additions. The third game in the series, The Denpa Men 3: The Rise of Digitoll, was released in Japan on August 7, 2013, in North America, Europe and Australia on May 8, 2014. On July 2, 2014, it was announced that a fourth title, The Denpa Men RPG Free! would be free-to-play. It was released in Japan on July 23, 2014. A fifth title, The New Denpa Men was released on mobiles in 2017, but shut down in May 2019. Due to the closure of the Nintendo eShop on March 27, 2023, the trilogy will no longer be purchasable after the specified date (as will the rest of the software available on the digital storefront), though it will remain available to redownload if already owned before the closure along with software updates for some time.

Gameplay
In The Denpa Men, the player captures Denpa Men to form a party to explore dungeons.  Using the Nintendo 3DS's camera, Denpa Men will appear in the player's surroundings when near a Wi-Fi signal or scanning a QR code. Denpa Men differ by name, color, appearance, and abilities.

Combat is not random and follows the traditional role-playing formula with an auto-battle option. Other common role-playing elements that appear in the game are treasure chests, item shops, and non-player characters.

If a dungeon is left with downed allies, every Denpa Man that was downed will leave the party. By purchasing offerings from the in-game shop, Denpa Men can be revived via the spirit shrine, Albeit only if they were caught via the antenna tower.

Setting 
The Denpa Men live on a small island which has a house, a shrine so that if Denpa Men die, players can retrieve them, a shop, and a tower that has an antenna on it that allows the player to catch Denpa Men called Antenna Tower. There is also a dock with a boat that takes players to many different islands in the game. Players can soon unlock a museum of Denpa Men, a PC for QR Code scanning, and an item shop.

Reception
"The Denpa Men" was given a rating of 7.5 on Metacritic. Reviewers praised the game for its music, art style, and gameplay, but criticized the high difficulty and poor translation.

References

External links

Official website

2012 video games
Genius Sonority games
Nintendo 3DS eShop games
Nintendo 3DS-only games
Role-playing video games
Video games scored by Hitoshi Sakimoto
Video games scored by Masaharu Iwata
Video games developed in Japan
Nintendo 3DS games